Filodes normalis is a moth in the family Crambidae. It was described by George Hampson in 1912. It is found in Cameroon, Ghana and Nigeria.

References

Moths described in 1912
Spilomelinae
Moths of Africa